Sulz was a municipality in the district of Laufenburg in the canton of Aargau in Switzerland. The late Roman watchtower in Rheinsulz is listed as a heritage site of national significance.  On 1 January 2010 the municipality of Sulz merged into Laufenburg.

References

Cultural property of national significance in Aargau
Former municipalities of Aargau
Populated places disestablished in 2010